Khadermoh is a village located in Pulwama district in Indian union territory of Jammu and Kashmir. At a distance of 14.6 km, its district headquarters and administrative units are located in Pulwama via Pampore - Kakapora Road and Pulwama-Srinagar Road that connects Khadermoh village to state capital Srinagar which is situated 19.5 km away via NH44 and NH1.

Population
As per 2011 Census of India, there are 1528 citizens residing in Khadermoh village, of which 760 are males and 768 are females. The male literacy rate is 56.2% while female literacy rate is 34.6%. The overall literacy rate recorded was 45.37%, compared to J&K.

References 

Villages in Pulwama district